José Antonio Villanueva Trinidad (born 3 February 1979 in Madrid) is a Spanish former track cyclist. Villanueva specialised in the sprint disciplines, where at world championships level he was won a silver medal in keirin and a bronze and a silver medal in team sprint. A few years after his initial retirement from competitive cycling, Villanueva returned as a sighted pilot in tandem track cycling at the 2012 Summer Paralympics, winning a silver and a bronze medal.

Career

UCI Track Cycling

Paralympics 
In 2012, having been out of competitive cycling for more than the minimum required 12 months, Villanueva was able to compete as the sighted pilot teamed with vision impaired cyclist José Enrique Porto Lareo in the tandem cycling events the London 2012 Summer Paralympics. The pair won the silver medal in the Men's 1 km Time Trial and the bronze medal in the Men's Sprint.

Awards 
In 2013, in recognition of his dedication to sport and his achievements at the 2012 Paralympics, Villanueva was awarded the silver Spanish Royal Order of Sports Merit.

References

External links 

1979 births
Living people
Cyclists at the 2000 Summer Olympics
Cyclists at the 2012 Summer Paralympics
Cyclists at the 2004 Summer Olympics
Paralympic cyclists of Spain
Olympic cyclists of Spain
Cyclists from Madrid
Spanish male cyclists
Spanish track cyclists